Najaf bey Fatali oglu Vazirov (17 February 1854 – 9 July 1926) was an Azerbaijani playwright and journalist.

Life
Vazirov was born in Shusha (then Elisabethpol Governorate, Russian Empire, present-day Azerbaijan) where he also received his primary education. He was sent to school when he was 12. He learned how to read and write within three months. A year later he was sent to college where he was assigned to a professor to teach him Russian alphabet. His new professor was an Armenian named "Mkirtich" who used to beat him unfairly. He ended up running from school because he was unable to tolerate to all the tortures. A man from "Khish" (Azerbaijani city) took him and tried to take a license indicating that Vazirov knew Russian so that he could be able to write formal letters. 

In 1868, despite his mother did not wanted him to leave, he came to Baku. His mother wanted him to remain in his previous position because life could have been more comfortable for him. His mom used to work and earned money. Upon coming to Baku, he was accepted to school because he was smart. He stayed in Baku for a year and lived with his relatives. A year later, he was given a scholarship and was provided with a place to live. He graduated from a gymnasium (secondary school) in Baku with a silver medal. In 1873, when he was in the sixth grade, for the first time he went to a Russian theater. He admired the play. The next day he asked his gymnasium professor called "Hasanbay Malikov" whether were there any Azerbaijani theater plays. Malikov found a play called "Haci Qara" by the author "Mirza Fatali Akhundov". He decided to the comedy play in his school together with other Azerbaijani students. Everyday after dinner, they rehearsed the play. His professor "Hasanbay Malikov" used to help during the rehearsals. There were lot of people in the day of play as well as the mayor of Baku "Staroselski" where everybody enjoyed the play. After the play the secretary of the mayor "Hasanbay Habibbayov" made a banquet for the students.  That night his professor " Hasanbay Malikov" sent a congratulatory letter to "Mirza Fatali Akhundov" who was the author of the original play. "Mirza Fatali Akhundov" replied with a two page long letter stating that he was very content. The last two years when he was studying in the gymnasium he started to give lessons. Gymnasium gave him a room where he taught lessons until the noon where later on he was studying. Even though he became weaker because of studying too much, he was still working hard. When he finished the gymnasium he had 600 manats. 

Vazirov got admitted to the Petrovsko-Razumovskaya Academy of Agriculture and Forestry in Saint Petersburg. When his money finished, he asked for financial help where nobody helped him financially nor replied back to his letter. Because of weather conditions in Saint Petersburg he became very sick. A Russian woman started taking care of Vazirov. He was very thankful to her taking care of him like a mother. Doctors said that he should move back to Moscow. In 1874, he moved back to Moscow and was enrolled to "Petrovski Academy". By then he had only 80 manats. He paid 50 of it for the tuition. When he had no money left he used to sleep under a rug on streets. Because he was very smart, he took a test where he was given a full scholarship. His professor "Hasanbay Malikov" started to write articles in the newspaper called "Akinchi" and Vazirov also started to write articles for that newspaper. He became friends with a very famous Russian journalist and writer "Vladimir Korolenko".  After finishing his post-secondary studies in the 1870s, Vazirov obtained the position of a forest warden in Dilijan (present-day Armenia) but was soon laid off due to the mistrust of the authorities towards the Petrovsko-Razumovskaya Academy alumni many of whom were known for their revolutionary views. He said that he was proud to be a graduate of Petrovski and he was oppressed unfairly. The nation loved him and he was popular among the people. When he was laid off he started to engage in national literature. He wrote as much as he could. In his book he wrote : " If I don't die and stay alive, I will continue to write and I appreciate the ones who tracked me became the reason why"  He then settled in Baku and passed a law course which enabled him to serve as a lawyer at the city court. He also started publishing articles and essays for the newly founded Azeri newspaper Akinchi.

By that time Vazirov had already written several dramatic pieces, mostly comedies reflecting the everyday life of contemporary students and families. Starting from the 1890s Vazirov's liberal views on politics start influencing his works. Vazirov continues the tradition initiated by Mirza Fatali Akhundov characterised by bringing in realist ideas into the Azerbaijani literature. In his first tragedy entitled Musibat-i Fakhraddin ("Fakhraddin's Grief", 1896) touches upon the theme of fanaticism suppressing young educated minds who struggle against reactionism and ignorance. This work is considered the first example of the realistic tragedy genre in the Azerbaijani literature. In his subsequent works such as Pahlivan-i Zamana ("Heroes of Our Time", 1900) he criticised the corrupt nature of the government institutions and remnants of the patriarchal social system. His last work, Taza asrin ibtidasi ("The Beginning of the New Century", 1924), was written after Azerbaijan became part of the Soviet Union and was dedicated to women's emancipation. He died in Baku in 1926.

Vazirov's works significantly enriched the repertoire of the then young Azerbaijani theatre and decisively established realistic genre as the dominant one in the Azerbaijani drama.

The Lankaran State Drama Theatre is named after Najaf bey Vazirov.

References

1854 births
1926 deaths
Writers from Shusha
Azerbaijani dramatists and playwrights
Azerbaijani journalists
Azerbaijani publicists
Azerbaijani nobility
19th-century Azerbaijani dramatists and playwrights
20th-century Azerbaijani dramatists and playwrights
Alumni by Baku Real School